Eriocottis pyrocoma is a moth in the family Eriocottidae. It was described by Edward Meyrick in 1891. It is found in Algeria.

The wingspan is 13–14 mm. The forewings are ochreous bronzy, posteriorly more or less irrorated (sprinkled) or wholly suffused with pale ochreous. The hindwings are dark grey.

References

Moths described in 1891
Eriocottidae
Lepidoptera of North Africa